

This is a list of the National Register of Historic Places listings in Acadia Parish, Louisiana.

This is intended to be a complete list of the properties on the National Register of Historic Places in Acadia Parish, Louisiana, United States. The locations of National Register properties for which the latitude and longitude coordinates are included below, may be seen in a map.

There are 8 properties listed on the National Register in the parish.  Another property was once listed, but has been removed.

Current listings

|}

Former listings

|}

See also

List of National Historic Landmarks in Louisiana
National Register of Historic Places listings in Louisiana

References

Acadia Parish